Edmond Dantès is a title character and the protagonist of Alexandre Dumas's 1844 adventure novel The Count of Monte Cristo. Within the story's narrative, Dantès is an intelligent, honest and loving man who turns bitter and vengeful after he is framed for a crime he did not commit. When Dantès finds himself free and enormously wealthy, he takes it upon himself to reward those who have helped him in his plight and punish those responsible for his years of suffering. He is known by the aliases The Count of Monte Cristo, Sinbad the Sailor (Sinbad le Marin), Abbé Busoni and Lord Wilmore.

History

Dantès, first mate 
When the reader is first introduced to Edmond Dantès, he arrives in Marseille as first mate aboard the merchant ship Le Pharaon (The Pharaoh).  At only 19 years old, the young Dantès seems destined for success. Although the trip was successful, the former Captain, Leclère, has fallen ill and died. Dantès relays these events to his patron, M. Morrel, who tells Dantès that he will try to have him named captain. Dantès rushes off to see his father and then his beloved, the young Catalan woman Mercédès, and the two agree to be married immediately.

The engagement and the arrest 
The marriage never occurs, however. On the very night of their nuptial feast, Dantès is arrested as a suspected Bonapartist, a helper to Napoléon, and taken to see the public prosecutor, Gérard de Villefort. Edmond had been anonymously and falsely denounced by Danglars, Edmond's shipmate over whom he was promoted, and Fernand Mondego, a rival suitor for Mercédès' hand. Prosecutor De Villefort concludes that Edmond is innocent, and assures him that he will be released. He then asks for a piece of evidence cited in a letter denouncing Edmond to the authorities. The letter claims that on Edmond's last voyage, he made a stopover at the island of Elba, and received a letter from the deposed Emperor Napoléon. Edmond hands over the letter, which he received in the name of Captain Leclère, and of which the contents are unknown to Edmond.  De Villefort throws the letter on the fire for the letter is addressed to his father. Once again he promises Edmond's speedy release. De Villefort has renounced his father, a staunch Bonapartist, and destroyed the letter to protect himself, not Edmond; to further protect his name, de Villefort sentences Edmond to imprisonment in the dreaded Chateau d'If, an island fortress from which no prisoner had ever escaped, and to which the most dangerous political prisoners are sent.

Despair and near-suicide 
After six long years in solitary confinement in the dungeons of the Chateau, Edmond decides to commit suicide by starving himself. Fearing he will be forced to eat, he throws out his food in secrecy. After nearly six months, he hears scratching against the wall of his cell. Curiosity about the source of the noise inspires him to begin eating again.  He taps on his wall several times, and when the scratching stops, he concludes that it is a prisoner trying to escape. He then uses the saucepan on which his food is served to begin digging where he heard the scratching before in hopes that it was another prisoner digging his way to freedom. Dantès eventually breaks through enough of the wall that he is able to exchange a brief greeting with an old Italian abbé named Faria, sometimes called the "Mad Priest", who had indeed been attempting to dig to freedom.

Edmond and the Abbé 
The two prisoners become very close, with the learned priest teaching Dantès all he knows about reading, mathematics, science, languages, philosophy, history, sword fighting, and economics. Together, they determine who betrayed Edmond, and although Faria disapproves, Edmond plans vengeance against his betrayers. The two spend years digging a tunnel to freedom, but Faria dies before they can escape. Before Abbe Faria died, he revealed to Edmond a secret treasure, hidden on the island of Monte Cristo. That night, Edmond exchanges himself for his mentor in the priest's bodybag, and escapes from the prison. The jailers, rather than burying prisoners, toss them over the fortress' wall into the sea, weighted with an iron ball chained around the legs. Using a knife made from a sharpened crucifix, Edmond frees himself and reaches the surface. Edmond swims to a small island nearby to seek refuge from the storm for the night. The next day, he swims out to sea as a smuggling ship passes by and is rescued under the pretense of being a shipwreck victim. Edmond soon suggests a stopover and trading of goods at the small island of Monte Cristo, during which he confirms that Faria's treasure exists. On this and subsequent visits, Edmond becomes wealthy.

Loyalty and betrayal 
Upon returning to Marseille, Edmond learns that his father had died of hunger and that Mercédès had married Fernand 8 months after he was supposedly executed for treason. His old neighbour Gaspard Caderousse is still alive, and—under the guise of the Abbé Busoni—Edmond visits him to learn more. Caderousse tells him that Morrel had tried to obtain a fair trial for Edmond, and how Mercédès pleaded for his release. He also learns that those who had remained loyal to him had suffered greatly, while those who had betrayed him had prospered. Edmond thanks Caderousse for the information, paying him with a large diamond that he said had come into Edmond's possession while in prison. Realizing that only Morrel had remained loyal, Edmond creates three disguises — an Englishman named Lord Wilmore, a clerk from the banking firm Thomson and French, and Sinbad the Sailor — and uses them to save Morrel from bankruptcy and suicide. Edmond then goes into hiding, spending nine years reforming himself as the Count of Monte Cristo.

Paris and the Count 
Edmond emerges into Parisian society as the mysterious and sophisticated Count of Monte Cristo. Having purchased the deed to the island from whence he obtained his treasure, Edmond is able to place himself in the upper strata of Parisian society and assume the role of one of the most influential men in all of France. As such, he is introduced to several other powerful men, most notably Danglars, who is now a wealthy banker; Mondego, who is now Count de Morcerf and a military hero; and M. Villefort, who is now the procureur du roi, one of the most powerful advocates in the country.  Furthermore, Mondego has married Mercédès, and the two have a son named Albert. Having established himself in Parisian society, and having distanced himself from Edmond Dantès, the Count is able to formulate his plans of revenge against the men who betrayed him. By the end of the novel, Edmond had exacted his revenge on all of the men who would have seen him rot in prison. He exposes Villefort and Mondego for their part in the conspiracy, ruining their respective reputations and bringing the police down upon them; Villefort goes insane, and Mondego commits suicide. Danglars is, for a time, captured by the Italian bandit Luigi Vampa, made to understand Edmond's suffering, and stripped of all of his wealth. Edmond, at the end of the novel, departs with Haydée (previously enslaved by Mondego and liberated by Edmond), leaving with words of immortal wisdom: "to wait and hope".

Portrayal in adaptations 
James O'Neill, father of playwright Eugene, performed the title role over 6,000 times during his career. Edmond Dantès has been portrayed on film many times by actors such as George Dolenz, Robert Donat, Jean Marais, Louis Jourdan, Gérard Depardieu, Richard Chamberlain, and, most recently, Jim Caviezel. Dantès has also been portrayed on stage, including in a musical adaptation of the novel.

In the Japanese animated television series Gankutsuou: The Count of Monte Cristo, he is voiced by Jōji Nakata in the Japanese version and by Jamieson Price in the English dub.

There are also at least three adaptations into television soap operas, the last of which being the 2006 Mexican series Montecristo.

In 2011, ABC debuted the television drama Revenge, billed as a loose adaptation of Dumas' The Count of Monte Cristo. In it, the character of Dantès is envisioned as a female protagonist by the name of Emily Thorne (portrayed by actress Emily VanCamp).

He is portrayed as an Avenger-class Servant in the popular mobile game, Fate/Grand Order, where his character is designed for the game by Rui Komatsuzaki and voiced by Nobunaga Shimazaki.

Craig Horner portrays the Count of Monte Cristo in the second episode of the sixth season of Once Upon a Time. In the series, Edmond seeks revenge on Baron Danglars for burning down his village and murdering his fiancée. Edmond manages to kill him at a party. Afterwards, he is approached by the Evil Queen Regina who was impressed with his vengeance and hires Edmond to kill Snow White and Prince Charming. Edmond poses as a victim of the Queen and becomes Snow and Charming's wine steward, but he is hesitant to kill them after he discovers they are nice people. Edmond nonetheless prepares to poison the royal couple. As Rumplestiltskin needs them alive for his own purposes, he poisons Snow and Charming's handmaiden Charlotte, whom Edmond has fallen in love with, with poison from the Agrabahn Vipers. This forces Edmond to take Charlotte to the Land of Untold Stories where their story "cannot play out". Years later, the Evil Queen has redeemed but because of Dr. Jekyll's serum, Regina and the Queen are two separate people. Edmond is among the inhabitants of the Land of Untold Stories that are emigrated to Storybrooke with Charlotte dying from the poison. The Evil Queen takes Edmond's heart to try to force him to kill Snow and Charming. This left Regina with no choice but to kill Edmond by throwing her sword into his back.

Referenced in other films 
Edmond Dantès was referenced in the final scenes of V for Vendetta (2005); protagonist Evey Hammond describes terrorist V as Edmond Dantès after he martyrs himself to bring down the tyrannical Norsefire government. Earlier in the movie, V and Evey watch the 1934 film adaptation of The Count of Monte Cristo, which V states is his favourite movie.

Writer/director John Hughes used Edmond Dantès as his pseudonym late in his career.

Sources 

The story of Dantès' imprisonment in the Château d'If was likely inspired by the imprisonment of Gen. Thomas-Alexandre Dumas (Alexandre Dumas, pères own father) in a dungeon fortress in Taranto, Italy, in 1799–1801.

References 

Alexandre Dumas characters
Fictional characters with alter egos
Fictional counts and countesses
Fictional sailors
Fictional French people in literature
Fictional vigilantes
Fictional swordfighters
Fictional prisoners and detainees
Literary characters introduced in 1844
Fictional prison escapees
Fictional attempted suicides
The Count of Monte Cristo